Cagan may refer to:
 Andrea Cagan — American writer.
 Phillip D. Cagan, American economist.
 Khagan, Mongolian title of imperial rank.